M is the thirteenth letter of the modern Latin alphabet. 

M may also refer to:

Companies and products
 M (fragrance), a 2008 fragrance by Mariah Carey
 M (rangefinder), a series of Leica cameras
 M (virtual assistant), a former virtual assistant in Facebook Messenger
 Macy's, Inc. (NYSE: M), an American department store chain
 Mercedes-Benz M-Class
 Miracle Mart, a Canadian department store known simply as "M" from 1986 to 1992
 Android M, a code name for the Android Marshmallow operating system
 BMW M, a subsidiary of car manufacturer BMW
 Farmall M, a tractor produced by International Harvester from 1939 to 1952
 Infiniti M, a line of cars

Numbers and units of measurement
 metre, symbol m
 mile (abbr.)
 nautical mile
 milli-, SI prefix m
 1000 (number), Roman numeral M
 mega-, SI prefix M
 million (abbr.)

Postal codes
 M, the postal code letter for Toronto in Canada
 M postcode area, a group of several postcode districts in Greater Manchester

Science and technology
 M (videocassette format), an obsolete recording format
 M-theory, a proposed solution for problems in superstring theories
 M band, radio frequencies from 60 to 100 GHz
 Mass (symbol m)
 Magnetic quantum number (symbol m)
 Messier object, in astronomy
 Metal (placeholder symbol M)
 Methionine, an alpha amino acid in biochemistry
 Molality (symbol m)
 Molar concentration, unit 
 Molar mass, (symbol M)
 ATC code M Musculo-skeletal system, a section of the Anatomical Therapeutic Chemical Classification System
 Seismic magnitude scales, various scales of magnitude using variations of M
 Slope, represented by variable m in a linear equation

Computing
 M or Wolfram Language, the programming language underlying Mathematica
 ".m", a MATLAB or GNU Octave file
 ".m", a Mathematica package
 ".m", an implementation file in Objective-C
 M, the MUMPS programming language
 M Sharp (programming language)
 M-code or just M, MATLAB programming language

Transportation
 Mu (rocket family), also known as M, a series of Japanese solid-fuelled carrier rockets
 Copenhagen Metro
 M (New York City Subway service)
 M Ocean View, a light rail line in San Francisco, U.S.

Entertainment

Characters 
 M (Marvel Comics), a character associated with the X-Men universe
 M (James Bond), the codename of the fictional head of MI6
 Minoru Kokubunji,  a Chobits anime character nicknamed M

Film and television
 M (1931 film), a German film directed by Fritz Lang
 M (1951 film), a remake of the previous, shifting the action from Berlin to Los Angeles
 M, a 2006 Japanese film directed by Ryūichi Hiroki
 M (2007 film), made in South Korea
 M (2018 Finnish film), a film directed by Anna Eriksson, loosely inspired by the last days of Marilyn Monroe
 M (2018 Israeli film), a documentary film directed by Yolande Zauberman about child abuse in Bnei Brak
 M, an obsolete film rating in the American Motion Picture Association of America film rating system
 M, films recommended for mature audiences in the Australian Office of Film and Literature Classification
M, the production code for the 1965 Doctor Who serial The Romans
 The M logo for the Brazilian television network Manchete.

Print publications 
 M (comic strip), a Norwegian comic strip
 M (John Cage book), a 1973 book by avant garde composer John Cage
 M (Peter Robb book), a 1998 book by Peter Robb about the Italian painter Caravaggio
 M (magazine), a monthly teenage magazine published by Bauer Media Group
 M: Son of the Century, a 2018 historical novel by Antonio Scurati

Video games 
 M, short for mature, a rating used by the Entertainment Software Rating Board to denote that a video game contains mature content

Music

Performers 
 M (band), a British techno-pop project of the artist Robin Scott
 Matthieu Chedid, French singer (stage name "-M-")
 Lee Min-woo, Korean singer (stage name "M")
 Mem Nahadr, American singer and performance artist (stage name "M")

Albums 
 M (John Abercrombie Quartet album), 1981
 M (Myrkur album), 2015
 M (Big Bang single album), 2015

Songs 
 "M" (song), a 2000 song by Ayumi Hamasaki
 "M", a song by Chantal Kreviazuk from her album Colour Moving and Still
 "M", a song by The Cure from their 1980 album Seventeen Seconds
 "M", a song by Princess Princess from the 1989 album Diamonds
 "M's" (song), a 2015 song by ASAP Rocky

Other uses
 M Resort, a hotel-casino in Las Vegas, Nevada, U.S.
 M-Source, a hypothetical source document for the Gospel of Matthew
 Moderaterna, a Swedish political party
 Baby M, subject of a famous child custody battle
 , the International Phonetic Alphabet symbol for a voiced bilabial nasal sound
 М, a letter of the Cyrillic alphabet
 M-ratio, a measure of the health of a player's chip stack in poker
 \m/, a common way of typing corna or devil's horns
 m, contraction of am, part of the English copular verb to be
 M, the symbol for the old German currency German gold mark
 m, the masculine grammatical gender
 m or M, the male gender
 M., the abbreviation for Monsieur
 M., the regnal year abbreviation for Mary I of England following her marriage to Philip II of Spain
 m., married
 m. or man., an abbreviation for the Azerbaijani manat (currency)
 𝕸, the Masoretic Text, the authoritative Hebrew text of the Tanakh
 Mike, the military time zone code for UTC+12:00

See also
 M series (disambiguation)
 M Train (disambiguation)
 Mister M (disambiguation)
 MU (disambiguation) (mu;  / )
 MM (disambiguation)

ca:M#Significats de la M
el:M#Χρήσεις του Μ ως διεθνούς συμβόλου
eu:M#Ikus, gainera
fur:M#Significâts
gl:M#Usos
sw:M#Maana za M
la:M#Abbreviationes
hu:M#Jelentései
nn:M#M kan stå for
simple:M#Meanings for M
sl:M#Pomeni M
sv:M#Betydelser